Red socks or Red Socks may refer to:

The "lucky red socks" worn in a public support campaign for yachtsman Sir Peter Blake
"Red Socks", an episode from the ninth season of the TV series 7th Heaven
The name of Heffley's soccer team in Diary of a Wimpy Kid: The Last Straw

See also
Red Sox (disambiguation)
"Red Socks Pugie", a 2008 single by Foals
"I Don't Wanna Cry No More", an instrumental by Helloween which includes a long jam called "Red Socks and the Smell of Trees"
Redstockings, a radical feminist group